Vrhovlje pri Kožbani is a small settlement northwest of Kožbana in the Municipality of Brda in the Littoral region of Slovenia on the border with Italy.

Name
The name of the settlement was changed from Vrhovlje to Vrhovlje pri Kožbani in 1953. The settlement is also known as Vrhuje in the local dialect and humorously as Gluho Vrhovlje (literally, 'deaf Vrhovlje'), in contrast to nearby Vrhovlje pri Kojskem (dubbed Slepo Vrhovlje 'blind Vrhovlje').

Church
The local church is dedicated to Saint Andrew and belongs to the Parish of Kožbana.

Notable people
Notable people that were born or lived in Vrhovlje pri Kožbani include:
Miloš Kamuščič (1852–1922), school teacher and writer

References

External links
Vrhovlje pri Kožbani on Geopedia

Populated places in the Municipality of Brda